Küfner is a surname. Notable people with the surname include:
 Matthias Küfner (born 1981), German footballer
 Robert A. Küfner (born 1988), German entrepreneur, author and investor